Reynolds Strait is a strait between Forrester Island on the north and Shepard and Grant Islands along the edge of Getz Ice Shelf on the south. The discovery of Forrester Island from USS Glacier on February 4, 1962, simultaneously established the existence of the strait, which was then sounded. The name was applied by Advisory Committee on Antarctic Names (US-ACAN) for Ralph R. Reynolds (1938–73), Lieutenant Commander, CEC, U.S. Navy who was Officer-in-Charge of the Navy Nuclear Power Unit at McMurdo Station in 1970.
 

Straits of Antarctica
Bodies of water of Marie Byrd Land